McColley is a surname. Notable people with the surname include:

Kevin McColley, American writer
Rob McColley (born 1984), American politician

See also
McCulley